Ganado High School is a high school in Ganado, Arizona. It is the only high school under the jurisdiction of the Ganado Unified School District.

In addition to Ganado the district serves Burnside, Cornfields, Klagetoh, Steamboat, and Toyei.

References

Public high schools in Arizona
Education on the Navajo Nation
Schools in Apache County, Arizona